Charles Donckier de Donceel (1802 in Chératte, Liège – 29 June 1888, in Brussels) was a Belgian entomologist mainly interested in Lepidoptera. He wrote (1882) Catalogue des Lépidoptères de Belgique. Annales de la Société entomologique de Belgique 26: 5-161 and many short papers on insects in the same journal.
He was a Member of the Royal Belgian Entomological Society.

Family

Charles' son, Henri Donckier de Donceel (3 March 1854, in Liège – 24 October 1926, in Paris), was also an entomologist, an insect dealer in Paris, and a member of the Société entomologique de France. He was mainly interested in Coleoptera, but also published some studies on Lepidoptera and Hymenoptera.

References 

 

Belgian entomologists
Belgian lepidopterists
1802 births
1888 deaths